Office of the President of the United States may refer to:

Executive Office of the President of the United States, the presidential staff
Oval Office, the room used as the presidential office